Borata is a town in southwestern Lesotho. It is located to the southeast of Mafeteng, close to the border with South Africa.

References
Fitzpatrick, M., Blond, B., Pitcher, G., Richmond, S., and Warren, M. (2004)  South Africa, Lesotho and Swaziland. Footscray, VIC: Lonely Planet.

Populated places in Lesotho